The Rebels was a 1976 American television show broadcast on KNBC, NBC's owned-and-operated station in Los Angeles.

Format
NBC television series where actors performed dramatic portrayals of famous American historical figures that were interviewed for a modern audience by host Keith Berwick.

Episode list

Season 1 (1976)
The only season of The Rebels aired in 1976. It consisted of thirteen episodes.

References

External links

1976 American television series debuts
1976 American television series endings
1970s American television series
English-language television shows
Television series about the history of the United States
NBC original programming
United States Bicentennial